Repubblica is a Milan Metro station on Line 3. Works began in 1984, and it was opened in 1990. Since 1997, it is connected with the Milano Repubblica railway station of the Milan Passante railway.

The station opened on 1 May 1990 as part of the inaugural section of Line 3 between Duomo and Centrale. Initially, Duomo was connected with Centrale by shuttle service, and on 16 December 1990, with the extension of the line to Porta Romana, full-scale service started.

The station, underground, is located under the square of the same name. It has two tracks, served by an island platform.

It serves the many luxury hotels in the area, in addition to offices and the Revenue Agency, the Land Registry, the historic Cozzi pool, the standing exhibition, Palazzo Dugnani and offices of some services of the Lombardy Region.

References

External links

Line 3 (Milan Metro) stations
Railway stations opened in 1990